Numerous articles relate to short-term interest rates, including:
 Bank rate
 Certificate of deposit
 Discount window
 Eurodollar
 Federal funds rate
 Libor
 Official bank rate of the United Kingdom
 Overnight rate
 Payday loan
 Primary dealer
 Prime rate
 Repurchase agreement, also known as "Repo"
 TED spread
 Treasury bill
 Vigorish
 Yield curve